The Mayo Stages Rally, Mayo Rally is an annual motorsport rallying event run by the Mayo & District Motor Club and held in County Mayo in Ireland.

History

The Mayo Stages Rally was first held in 1983. Niall Maguire holds the honor of the most rally wins - 4. The latest event in 2020 was won by Donagh Kelly. Most stage wins was achieved by Declan Boyle - 25.

2020
Mayo & District Motorsport Club returned to Castlebar for the first time since 2009. The two previous events in 2017 and 2018 took place in Achill. There was no event in 2019. The 2020 event consisted of three stages run three times located in the Castlebar and Westport areas, covering  of special stage distance and  liaison.

The event was round 1 of the Triton Showers National Rally Championship and Sligo Pallets Border Rally Championship.

Under direction of Clerk of the course David Breen, it was agreed that all cars be fitted with the STS equipment as mandatory. Motorsport Ireland have brought a new rule in relation to the use of the STS at the beginning of the season. Other events found STS equipment controversial and their use was not enforced. The event featured Junior Rally and Historic Rally classes, and also operated Rally 2 (Restart after retirement). The entry fee was announced to have been reduced to €770 to boost entries. There were 80 starters, 55 cars have completed the rally.

The event took place in heavy rain in the aftermath of Storm Jorge which made it difficult. The second stage was cancelled due to a local issue. The drama developed in the penultimate stage. At the final service Moffett's lead was 21.6 seconds ahead of Kelly with Hurson another nine seconds adrift. Josh Moffett stopped after the finish with fuel pressure problems with his Hyundai i20 R5 and Peadar Hurson rolled his Ford Fiesta WRC in the final loop of stage 8. Donagh Kelly went on to claim the victory.

2021

The 2020 Mayo Rally was the last rally event that took place before the COVID-19 pandemic lockdown came into effect on the 12 March 2020. The 2021 event did not take place due to ongoing pandemic.

2022
Mayo Stages Rally 2022 was the opening round of Motorsport Ireland National Irish Rally Championship, as well as counting round of Sligo Pallets Border Rally Championship, Top Part West Coast Rally Championship and Motorsport Ireland Junior Rally Series. Rally consisted of 8 stages spanning 93.81 km of competitive racing in the vicinity of Claremorris, Ballyhaunis and Cloonfad.

Roll of Honor

* as of 2022

References

External links
 Web page by the organizing Motor Club

Annual events in Ireland
Rally competitions in Ireland
Motorsport in Ireland
Motorsport competitions in Ireland